Porphyrios Dikaios (Greek: Πορφύριος Δίκαιος) FSA (16 August 190423 August 1971) was a Greek Cypriot archaeologist born in Nicosia. 

He studied archaeology in the National and Kapodistrian University of Athens, in the British School at Athens (1924-1925) and the University of Liverpool (1925-1926). He interrupted his studies in Liverpool to continue them at the University of Lyon and finally the University of the Sorbonne where he graduated in 1929. 

After returning to Cyprus he was assigned at the age of 25 to the position of Assistant Curator of the Cyprus Museum (1929-1931) and a year later he started his own excavation work. He became Curator of the Cyprus Museum (1931-1960) and finally Director of the Department of Antiquities (1960-1963) after the independence of Cyprus from Britain. He conducted excavation work at Bellapais-Vounous (1931), in the Neolithic site of Khoirokitia, in the Chalcolithic site of Erimi (1933-1935), the Bronze Age site of Enkomi, as well as Sotira (1934) and Salamis, and identified the Philia culture; his work focused on Prehistoric Cyprus. He retired from the Department in 1963 and traveled to the United States where he taught at the University of Princeton and Brandeis University. In 1966 he moved to Heidelberg where he taught at the University of Heidelberg as a professor of Near Eastern archaeology until the end of his life.

Publications 
 Les Cultes Préhistoriques dans l'ile de Chypre (1932)
 Ploughing in Cyprus in the Early Bronze Age (1933)
 La Civilisation néolithique dans l'ile de Chypre (1936)
 An Iron Age Painted Amphora in the Cyprus Museum (1936/37)
 The Excavations at Vounous-Bellapais in Cyprus (1940)
New Light on Prehistoric Cyprus (1940)
 The Context of the Enkomi Tablets (1962)
 Enkomi: Excavations 1948–1958, Vols. I-IIIb. Mainz am Rhein: Verlag Philipp von Zabern, (1969–1971)

See also 

 Peter Megaw
 Hector Catling
 Swedish Cyprus Expedition

References 

Greek Cypriot people
1904 births
1971 deaths
Cypriot archaeologists
Prehistorians
20th-century archaeologists
Cypriot academics

20th-century Cypriot people
National and Kapodistrian University of Athens alumni
University of Paris alumni
Princeton University faculty
Brandeis University faculty
Academic staff of Heidelberg University
People from Nicosia